The Lānaʻi ʻalauahio (Paroreomyza montana montana) was found on much of the island of Lana'i in the Hawaiian archipelago. It apparently was common until the early 1900s, when there appeared to have been a steep decline in birds on the island. It was similar to the Maui alauahio and this species may have reacted similarly to its existing relative, to which it was considered conspecific. This bird was one of several to vanish from Lana'i, along with others such as the Lanai hookbill.

The extinction of this species was mainly caused by habitat degradation. Apparently the many forest plants of Lana'i had become displaced, rare or even extinct as a result of human activity. With settlers came a host of invasive plants from Europe and other continents. The nail in the coffin for the 'alauahio may have been the destruction of forest associated with the construction of the island's main city, Lanai City.

Though not much of its natural history is known, its song was recorded to be a simple chip that was sung at an interval of one chip every three seconds.  It disappeared in 1937, the same year as the ʻula-ʻai-hawane disappeared on Hawaii.

References 

Frohawk, F.W. "Annotated List of Hawai'i's Extinct Birds" 3 January 2008

Paroreomyza
Hawaiian honeycreepers
Biota of Lanai
Extinct birds of Hawaii
Bird extinctions since 1500
Birds described in 1890
Taxa named by Scott Barchard Wilson